The following is a timeline of the history of the city of Odesa, Ukraine.

13th to 17th century

 1240 - Tatars begin settling herds in the region. 
 1415 - a settlement of Kachibei (Khadjibey, Hacıbey, Kotsiubiyiv) was first mentioned.
 15th century - Khadjibey ceded to Lithuania.
 1529 - Ottoman conquest.

18th century
 1764 - Fortress Yeni Dünya built at Khadjibey by Turks.
 1789 - Russian forces take fortress.
 1791 - Khadjibey annexed to Novorossiya.
 1794 - Odesa founded by decree of Catherine II of Russia.
 1795
 Population: 2,250.
 Cathedral of the Transfiguration founded.

19th century
 1802 - Population: 9,000.
 1803 - Duc de Richelieu in power.
 1804 - Commercial school founded.
 1805
 Odesa becomes administrative center of New Russia.
 Theatre opens.
 Russian Orthodox church built.
 1808 - Troitzkaya Church active.
 1809
 Cathedral built.
 Opera house built.
 1812 - Plague.
 1814 - Population: 25,000.
 1816 - Louis Alexandre Andrault de Langeron in power.
 1817 - Richelieu Lyceum established.
 1819 - Odesa becomes a free port.
 1821
 Church of the Dormition built.
 Pogrom against Jews.
 1824 - Odesa becomes "seat of the governors-general of Novorossia and Bessarabia."
 1825 - Archeological Museum founded.
 1826
 Fyodor Palen in power.
 Jewish school established.
 Richelieu Monument unveiled.
 1828 - Imperial Rural Association for Southern Russia founded.
 1830
 Public library established.
 Vorontsov Palace built.
 1838 - Plague.
 1841 - Giant Staircase constructed.
 1846 - Londonska Hotel opens.
 1847 - Novobazarnaya Church built.
 1850 - Population: 100,000.
 1853
 Crimean War begins.
 Roman Catholic Church rebuilt.
 1854 - Anglo-French fleet attacks Odesa.
 1856 - Russian Steam Navigation and Trading Company established.
 1857 - August 15: Free port status revoked.
 1859 - Pogrom against Jews.
 1862
 Odesa Military District established.
 Vorontsov Lighthouse built.
 1865 - Imperial Novorossiya University established.
 1866 - Odesa-Balta railway begins operating.
 1871
 Pogrom against Jews.
 Russian Technical Society, Odesa branch, founded.
 1873 - Population: 162,814.
 1874 - Theatre Velikanova built.
 1875 - Tzar visits Odesa.
 1876 - Turkish forces attack Odesa.
 1880 - Horse tramway begins operating.
 1881
 Steam tramway begins operating.
 Pogrom against Jews.
 1882 - Population: 217,000.
 1887 - Theatre built.
 1894 - Odesa Committee of the Social Democratic Workers Party organized.
 1895 - St. Panteleimon church consecrated.
 1897 - Lutheran Church built.
 1899
 General Post Office built.
 Exchange built.
 Bristol Hotel opens.
 1900 - Population: 449,673.

20th century
 1902 - Cadet School active.
 1905
 June: Potemkin uprising.
 Pogrom against Jews.
 1906
 Uprising.
 Municipal Library built.
 1907 - Myrograph film studio in business.
 1910
 Electric Tram begins operating.
 Trade fair held.
 1913
 Conservatoire founded.
 Sergiyev Artillery School active.
 Population: 631,040.
 1917 - City occupied by Ukrainian Tsentral'na Rada, French Army, Red Army, and White Army following the Bolshevik Revolution.
 1918
 13 March: Odesa occupied by Central Powers.
 Odesa becomes capital of Odesa Soviet Republic.
 Polytechnic University established.
 December : Odesa occupied by the French Army
 1919 - Odesa Film Studio founded.
 1920 - Red Army in power.
 1921 - Odesa State Economics University established.
 1922
 Odesa State Medical Institute established.
 Odesa Zoo opens.
 1924 - Odesa Philharmonic Theater opens.
 1926 - State Odesa Russian Drama Theatre established.
 1928 - Spartak Stadium opens.
 1933 - School of Stolyarsky established.
 1935 - Kosior Memorial Stadium built.
 1936
 The Filatov Institute of Eye Diseases & Tissue Therapy founded.
 Dynamo football club formed.
 1941
 August 8-October 16: Siege of Odesa.
 October 17: Axis occupation begins.
 October 22–24: 1941 Odesa massacre.
 Odessa becomes capital of Romanian-administered Transnistria Governorate.
 1944
 April 10: Red Army takes city; Axis occupation ends.
 ODO Odesa football team active.
 Odesa State Maritime Academy founded.
 1945 - Odesa designated a Hero City of the USSR.
 1952 - Railway Station rebuilt.
 1961
 Odesa International Airport built.
 Pushkin Museum opens.
 1963 - Avangard rugby club formed.
 1965 - Population: 735,000.
 1973 - April 10: Humorina festival begins.
 1979 - Population: 1,072,000.
 1984 - Deribasivska Street pedestrianized.
 1985 - Population: 1,126,000.
 1989 - Outdoor market relocates to Odessa-Ovidiopol highway.
 1992 - BIPA-Moda basketball club formed.
 1994
 Eduard Gurwits becomes mayor.
 New music festival begins.
 1998 - Rouslan Bodelan becomes mayor.
 1999 - Odesa Numismatics Museum established.
 2000 - Quarantine Pier designated free economic zone and port.

21st century
 2001 - Al-Salam Mosque opens.
 2003 - Rebuilt Odesa Cathedral consecrated.
 2005 - Eduard Gurwits becomes mayor again.
 2007 - Pryvoz Market rebuilt.
 2010 - Odesa International Film Festival begins.
 2011
 Chornomorets Stadium built.
 FC SKA Odesa formed.
 Aleksey Kostusyev becomes mayor.
 Population: 1,003,705.
 2014 - 2014 Odesa clashes.
2014 - after Crimea annexation by Russia, Odesa become the main naval base of the Armed Forces of Ukraine.
 2018 - Population: 993,831 (estimate).
 2022 - Odesa is being constantly shelled by Russian missiles and the Odesa port is blocked.

See also
 Odesa history
 History of the Jews in Odesa
 List of mayors of Odesa, Ukraine

References

Bibliography

Published before 1950
 
 
 
 
 
 
 
 
 
 
 
 
 
 

Published since 1950
 Dzhumyga, Ievgen. "The Home Front In Odesa During The Great War (July 1914–February 1917): The Gender Aspect Of The Problem." Danubius 31 (2013):pp 223+ online
 
 
 Herlihy, Patricia. "The ethnic composition of the city of Odesa in the nineteenth century." Harvard Ukrainian Studies 1.1 (1977): 53–78.

External links

 New York Public Library. Images related to Odesa, various dates.

Images

 
Years in Ukraine
Odesa